Victor Louis (10 May 1731, Paris – 2 July 1800, Paris) was a French architect, disqualified on a technicality from winning the Prix de Rome in architecture in 1755.

Life
He was born Louis-Nicolas Louis in Paris. He did not adopt the name Victor until after he returned from a trip to Poland in 1765. In 1770 he married the pianist and composer Marie-Emmanuelle Bayon. They had a daughter, Marie-Hélène-Victoire, in 1774. A full biography of Victor Louis was published by Charles Marionneau in Bordeaux in 1881.

Work
Louis' masterpiece is the Grand Théâtre de Bordeaux of 1780. He also designed other theatres, including  the Salle Richelieu on the rue de Richelieu (1790, later to become the home of the Comédie-Française) and the Théâtre National de la rue de la Loi (1793, demolished). The Salle Richelieu was the first major building with a roof structure of iron which was selected for its fire-resistant qualities when compared with wood. Other buildings include the Intendance in Besançon (completed 1776), the garden galleries of the Palais-Royal in Paris (1781–1784), the Salle de Beaujolais (1782–83), and the Château du Bouilh near Bordeaux (1786–1789, unfinished).

Gallery

Notes

Bibliography
 Ayers, Andrew (2004). The Architecture of Paris. Stuttgart; London: Edition Axel Menges. .
 Braham, Allan (1980). The Architecture of the French Enlightenment. Berkeley: University of California Press. .
 Croizier, Laurent; Bourrousse, Luc (2011). The Grand-Théâtre of Bordeaux. Bordeaux: Festin. .
 Fletcher, Banister (1961). A History of Architecture on the Comparative Method, 17th edition, edited by R. A. Cordingley. London: The Athlone Press. . 1963 reprint: . Copy at Internet Archive.
 John, Richard (1998). "Louis, Victor [Louis-Nicolas]" in Turner 1998, vol. 19, pp. 725–726.
 Lacouture, Jean (1994). Le Grand-Théâtre de Bordeaux, ou L’Opéra des Vendanges, photographs by Dominique Thillard. Paris: Caisse nationale des monuments historiques et des sites. .
 Marionneau, Charles (1881). Victor Louis, Architecte du Théâtre de Bordeaux: Sa vie, ses travaux et sa correspondance 1731–1800. Bordeaux: G. Gounouilhou View at Google Books..
 Prudent, Henri; Guadet, Paul (1903). Les salles de spectacle construites par Victor Louis à Bordeaux, au Palais-Royal et à la place Louvois. Paris: Librairie de la construction moderne. .
 Turner, Jane, editor (1998). The Dictionary of Art, reprinted with minor corrections, 34 volumes. New York: Grove. .

1731 births
Architects from Paris
1800 deaths
18th-century French architects
Prix de Rome for architecture